In March 2022, during Russia's invasion of Ukraine, Russian officials falsely claimed that public health facilities in Ukraine were "secret U.S.-funded biolabs" purportedly developing biological weapons, which was debunked as disinformation by multiple media outlets, scientific groups, and international bodies. The claim was amplified by China's Ministry of Foreign Affairs and Chinese state media, and was also promoted by QAnon and gained support among far-right groups in the U.S.

Russian scientists, inside and outside Russia, have publicly accused the Russian government of lying about evidence for covert "bioweapons labs" in Ukraine, saying that documents presented by Russia's Defense Ministry describe pathogens collected for public health research. The "bioweapons labs" claim has also been refuted by the US, Ukraine, the United Nations, and the Bulletin of the Atomic Scientists.

Kremlin accusations and spread of conspiracy theory

Russian and Chinese officials and state media 
Both Russian and Chinese officials have made accusations in attempt to boost the conspiracy theory. Russian proponents have included Foreign Minister Sergey Lavrov, United Russia leader Dmitry Medvedev, the official Twitter account of the Russian embassy in Sarajevo, and the Russian state-owned media outlets Sputnik and TASS. China's Foreign Affairs Ministry has asked for a "full account" of Ukraine's "biological military activities at home and abroad."

On March 11, Russia called a meeting in the UN to discuss the allegations, which Reuters described as an attempt to re-assert the unproven allegations without evidence. This led the UN to say there was no evidence of a Ukraine biological weapons program, while the United States and its allies accused Russia of spreading the claim as a prelude to Russia potentially launching biological or chemical attacks.

In July 2022, two Russian State Duma members announced that a biolabs commission investigation found that Ukraine had administered drugs to its soldiers that "completely neutralize the last traces of human consciousness and turn them into the most cruel and deadly monsters", and that this was evidence that "this system for the control and creation of a cruel murder machine was implemented under the management of the United States".

United States and Russian Federation official inquiries 

In June 2022 the Russian Federation, after presenting its own narrative across state media, filed official questions to the United States under article V of the Biological and Toxin Weapons Convention (BWC). The US's responses, published in August 2022, accuses Russia of a number of "mischaracterizations". The US also asserts that the document sent by Russia did not contain actual questions, but rather a series of "assertions" whose overall purpose is "to imply an unspecified sinister motive". The US also replied to specific accusations by Russia as follows:

 Laboratories in Ukraine were established on a legal basis, per the BWC, which encourages cooperative research between signatory states in the area of new potential threats, such as zoonotic diseases. The US pointed out that it has been running cooperative research together with Russia itself since 1992 for 21 years in exactly the same way as with Ukraine and other countries. This US-Russian cooperative research program was terminated by Russia in 2005.
 Russia alluded to Ukraine improperly "send[ing] all strains and data from disease surveillance" to the United States. The US asserted this was a mischaracterization, since transfer of samples is a typical part of any scientific cooperation in any area. The exchange of samples was voluntary and applied to samples explicitly requested by the US side for research purposes, rather than a blanket order to transfer of all results as suggested by Russia.
 The United States also asserts that the documents published by Russia were "virtually unreadable". US requests to provide readable copies was ignored, and later used by Russia to claim that the "US did not provide responses" to their legitimate documents.
 Russia accused Ukraine and the US of forming the cooperative agreement in "secret", while Russia itself has relied on information openly published by Ukraine and US research websites. The joint research program has also resulted in dozens of scientific articles that remain openly available in scientific journals, and further summarized in official BWC reports.
 Russia claimed the list of specific pathogens studied at Mechnikov Anti-Plague Scientific Institute in Odesa, Ukraine "disagrees with the current Ukraine’s health issues". The US has replied that this claim reveals ignorance regarding the scope of Ukraine's current health issues (e.g. cases of anthrax and cholera are endemic to Ukraine and another huge outbreak of the latter "could occur as a result of the war waged by the Russian Federation").

Online conspiracy theorists 
In March 2022, CNN, France 24, and Foreign Policy reported that QAnon promoters were echoing Russian disinformation that created conspiracy theories about US-funded laboratories in Ukraine. Russian state media falsely claimed that "secret US biolabs" were creating weapons, a claim refuted by the US, Ukraine, and the United Nations. In reality, the Ukrainian Ministry of Health and the U.S. Department of Defense signed an agreement in 2005 to prevent the spread of technologies and pathogens that might be used in the development of biological weapons. New laboratories were established to secure and dismantle the remnants of the Soviet biological weapons program, and since then have been used to monitor and prevent new epidemics. The laboratories are publicly listed, not secret, and are owned and operated by host countries such as Ukraine, not by the US. The Ukrainian-owned threat reduction labs, which are listed by the U.S. Embassy, also send academics to international scientific conferences who publicize their work. In the conspiracy theory interpretation, QAnon followers have claimed to justify the invasion of Ukraine as an effort by Putin and Trump to destroy "military" laboratories in Ukraine. InfoWars has also supported the conspiracy theory, running a headline: "Russian Strikes Targeting US-Run Bio-Labs in Ukraine?".

Zignal Labs assessed that English language influencers had initially elaborated the talking point, which was spread by Russian propaganda thereafter, with Russian-language posts on "biolabs" increasing after March 6 to outpace English-language posts on the subject. According to cybersecurity and threat intelligence company Pyrra Technologies, the first mention of biolabs in Ukraine was a February 14 post on alt-tech far-right social network Gab, ten days before the start of the invasion.

The Center for Monitoring, Analysis and Strategy (CeMAS) found that a German Telegram channel with over 200,000 subscribers was promoting false claims about the US having a secret biological laboratory in Ukraine. CeMAS cofounder Jan Rathje said: "All of these new [online] actors that became influential during the pandemic switched to a pro-Russia position. They always focus on a large conspiracy going on from the elite against the people. People are suffering in Ukraine. And they wouldn't deny that. But they would say, 'Yeah, but that's part of the larger, inhumane conspiracy that's going on.'"

Spread of conspiracy theory and reactions 
According to journalist Justin Ling, the Ukraine bioweapons myth spread "from a fringe QAnon channel directly to Fox News and Donald Trump Jr." Fox News commentator Tucker Carlson claimed that the U.S. was "funding the creation of deadly pathogens" and broadcast statements by Russian and Chinese government spokesmen accusing Washington of operating a bioweapons program in Europe. Tucker Carlson continued the story on several episodes, including an episode with Glenn Greenwald on March 10, 2022.

That month, as reported by Mother Jones, the Kremlin sent a memo to state-friendly media outlets saying it was "essential" to use video clips of Carlson "as much as possible". Mother Jones further observed Carlson was the only Western media pundit the Kremlin adopted in this way.

Newsweek reported former U.S. representative from Hawaii, Tulsi Gabbard had been labelled as a "Russian asset" by critics for espousing the idea that "U.S.-funded bio labs" in Ukraine are conducting research into "deadly pathogens". Although Gabbard "did not repeat the claims of Ukraine developing bio weapons with U.S. military backing ... a number of people criticized Gabbard's tweet for appearing to echo falsehoods being peddled by Russia," with critics including Illinois Republican representative Adam Kinzinger and Mitt Romney. Tulsi Gabbard also appeared on Fox News to discuss the claims with Tucker Carlson, and clips of this were played on Russian state television. Gabbard later clarified the comments to say that she does not believe there are bioweapons in Ukraine, but said that labs allegedly researching pathogens in an active warzone may be damaged by Russia.

A Brookings Institution dataset tracked how a group of right-wing political podcasts were promoting the "Ukraine bioweapons labs" myth between March 8 and 18, with the most prolific being Steve Bannon and Charlie Kirk, who supported the narrative in five episodes each. Previous COVID-19 conspiracy theories were frequently rehashed, with Anthony Fauci mentioned over 50 times, among various unsubstantiated accusations. According to Brookings, the podcasting medium served to propagate disinformation potentially faster than 'social' media, because there is no "built-in mechanism" for listeners to push back on claims or fact-check.

A study by the Center for Countering Digital Hate found that Facebook failed to label 80% of posts sharing external articles that spread the conspiracy theory as false or misleading. The posts used in the study were dated from 24 February to 14 March. A Facebook spokesperson said that the study "misrepresents the scale and scope of our efforts".

Connection to previous conspiracy theories 
Political scientist and espionage scholar Thomas Rid suggests this may be a case of the Kremlin "accusing the other side of the thing they are in fact doing" based on historical precedent (accusation in a mirror). In the 1980s, when the Soviets deployed chemical weapons in Laos and Afghanistan, Soviet-aligned press published disinformation alleging that the CIA was weaponizing mosquitoes. False Soviet reports blaming HIV/AIDS on the United States, commonly called Operation INFEKTION, also aimed to distract from contemporary Soviet activities. Additionally, Thomas Rid stated that the right-wing adoption of the Ukraine bioweapons conspiracy theory may be influenced by the COVID-19 lab leak theory.

The Kremlin has a history of fomenting conspiracy theories about ordinary biology labs in former Soviet republics, having previously spread propaganda about Georgia and Kazakhstan similar to recent accusations deployed against Ukraine. For example, the Kremlin made false accusations against the public health facility, Lugar Research Center in Georgia, as the research center worked on fighting against the COVID-19 pandemic. The labs have been widely observed by international partnerships since the Nunn–Lugar Cooperative Threat Reduction, which was established to contain and eliminate weapons of mass destruction (nuclear, chemical, and biological) left behind in the former Soviet Union. When this threat reduction was complete, the research facilities, owned by the newly independent countries, began the task of public health research, including monitoring and preventing new epidemics. The Department of Defense provides "technical support to the Ukrainian Ministry of Health since 2005 to improve public health laboratories" as part of a continuation of international agreements to reduce biological threats, but does not control or provide personnel to the public health facilities.

Robert Mackey, a writer for The Intercept, noted similarities the conspiracy theory shared with the false and fabricated claims the United States made about Iraq's WMD programme in the lead-up to the Iraq War. He stated that, while Russian officials regularly cited this as a reason to dismiss criticism against their conduct in Ukraine, they nevertheless echoed the dishonesty of the Bush Administration whenever they presented false claims about Ukrainian bioweapons as fact, saying:

See also 
 Soviet biological weapons program
 Russian information war against Ukraine
 Conspiracy theories related to the Trump–Ukraine scandal
 Biden–Ukraine conspiracy theory
 Disinformation in the 2022 Russian invasion of Ukraine

References 

Propaganda in Russia related to the 2022 Russian invasion of Ukraine
Conspiracy theories in Russia
Disinformation operations
QAnon
Conspiracy theories in the United States
Biological weapons
Conspiracy theories in China